Andrew Bridgmont is an English actor, playwright and stage director, son of thespian and author Peter Bridgmont (January 1929 - 24 June 2019). He is primarily known for his theatre work like at the Globe Theatre and appearing in such films as Matthew Vaughn's Kingsman: The Secret Service (2014), James Marsh's The Theory of Everything (2014) or TV series like Penny Dreadful (2014-2016) or Grandchester. Bridgmont was the winner of the International Playwriting Festival award for Red on Black.

Education 
Bridgmont did an arts foundation course, and later graduated from the Royal Academy of Arts in London. He took part in workshops at Ovalhouse in Lambeth. Bridgmont is also a classically trained violinist.

Theatre

Director

Actor

Film

Television

Documentary

Video Games

Books 
Bridgmont is directly cited or mentioned in the following works (non-exhautive list):

 Reading Shakespeare on Stage (1995) by Herbert R. Coursen. University of Delaware Press.
 Shakespeare Comes to Broadmoor: The Actors Are Come Hither: The Performance of Tragedy in a Secure Psychiatric Hospital (1992) by Murray Cox. Jessica Kingsley Publishers.
 The Europa Directory of Literary Awards and Prizes (2015) by Susan Leckey. Routledge.
 Staging Shakespeare at the New Globe (Early Modern Literature in History; 1999) by P. Kiernan. Palgrave Macmillan.
 Theatre at Stratford-upon-Avon: Volume 1 (1994) by Michael Mullin. Greenwood Press.
 American Theatre, Volume 18 (2001) by the Theatre Communications Group.
 Cahiers Élisabéthains (1989). Paul Valéry University Press.
 Plays and Players (1993). Hansom Books.
 London Theatre Record (1990) and the Theatre Record, Volume 21 (2001) by Ian Herbert. Theatre Record Limited.

References 

English stage actors
English theatre directors
Year of birth missing (living people)
Living people